The African section of the 2022 FIFA World Cup qualification acted as qualifiers for the 2022 FIFA World Cup, to be held in Qatar, for national teams which are members of the Confederation of African Football (CAF). A total of five slots in the final tournament were available for CAF teams.

Format
A previous proposal to merge the qualification rounds for the 2021 Africa Cup of Nations with those for the World Cup was turned down after a CAF meeting on 11 June 2018.

CAF reverted to the format used for the 2014 FIFA World Cup qualification competition.
First round: 28 teams (ranked 27–54) played home-and-away over two legs. The 14 winners advanced to the second round.
Second round: 40 teams (ranked 1–26 and 14 first round winners) were divided into ten groups of four teams to play home-and-away round-robin matches. The ten group winners advanced to the third round.
Third round: Ten second round group winners played home-and-away over two legs. The five winners qualified for the World Cup.

Entrants
All 54 FIFA-affiliated football associations from CAF entered qualification. The FIFA World Rankings of July 2019 were used to determine which nations would compete in the first round. For seeding in the second and third round draws, the most recent FIFA Rankings prior to those draws were used.

Libya was threatened with exclusion from the qualifiers if it failed to pay debts to their former coach Javier Clemente. However, Libya complied after FIFA gave them a new deadline. Sierra Leone also faced possible exclusion from the qualifiers due to the suspension of their football association. However, the suspension was lifted by the FIFA Council on 3 June 2019.

Schedule
Below is the schedule of the 2022 FIFA World Cup qualifying campaign, according to the FIFA International Match Calendar. After the rescheduling of the 2021 Africa Cup of Nations final tournament from June/July to January/February, the dates of the matchdays 1–2 of the second round were also rescheduled. Because of the interruption of the competition due to the COVID-19 pandemic, the schedule of the second and third round was revised again and on 19 August 2020 CAF announced the new dates for the aforementioned rounds.

First round

The draw for the first round was held on 29 July 2019 at 12:00 EST (UTC+2), at the CAF headquarters in Cairo, Egypt.

Second round

The draw for the second round was held on 21 January 2020, 19:00 CAT (UTC+2), at the Ritz-Carlton hotel in Cairo, Egypt.

Group A

Group B

Group C

Group D

Group E

Group F

Group G

Group H

Group I

Group J

Third round
 The ten group winners from the second round were drawn into five  ties, with the teams seeded based on FIFA World Rankings. The draw was held on 22 January 2022 in Douala, Cameroon. The lower ranked team played the first leg at home. The winners of each fixture qualified for the 2022 FIFA World Cup.

Qualified teams
The following five teams from CAF qualified for the final tournament.

Top goalscorers

Below are full goalscorer lists for each round:

First round
Second round
Third round

References

External links

Qualifiers – Africa, FIFA.com

 
Caf
FIFA World Cup qualification (CAF)
2019 in African football
2021 in African football
2022 in African football